The 2009-10 British and Irish Cup pool stage is a rugby union tournament to be played during November 2009, February and March 2010.

The twenty four teams were arranged into four pools of six, with each team playing the other team in their pool once and the four pool winners qualifying for the knockout stage.

The following point scoring system was used:
 Four points for a win
 Two points for a draw
 One point for scoring four tries or more in a match
 One point for losing a match by seven or less points

{| class="wikitable"
|+ Key to colours
|-
| style="background: #ccffcc;" |     
|Top team in each group advance to semi-finals
|}

Pool A

Pool B

Pool C

Pool D

 The round one game between Pontypridd RFC and Cardiff RFC, was played at Cardiff's home ground, due to Pontypridd's pitch being unplayable.*

See also
 2009-10 British and Irish Cup

British and Irish
2009–10 in English rugby union
2009–10 in Welsh rugby union
2009–10 in Scottish rugby union
2009–10 in Irish rugby union